Torchy the Battery Boy is a British television series, the second produced by AP Films and Gerry Anderson, running from 1959 to 1961. Directed by Anderson, it was a collaboration with author Roberta Leigh, with music scored by Barry Gray, art direction from Reg Hill and special effects by Derek Meddings.

Based on string puppets, the series depicted adventures of the eponymous boy doll, who had a battery inside him and a lamp in his head, and his master Mr Bumbledrop, voiced by Kenneth Connor (known for his appearances in the Carry On films), who also voiced a number of other characters.

The second series of 26 episodes was produced by Associated British-Pathé without the involvement of Anderson and AP Films. The show is one of several children's television programmes from the mid-twentieth century to exist in its entirety, without loss or damage. Both series have been digitally remastered and released on DVD.

Plot
Torchy, the Battery Boy, was created by Mr. Bumbledrop, a lonely old toymaker who spends the majority of his days tending to his garden, where the neighbourhood children play. Torchy has a lamp on his head, and when he pushes a button on his jacket and utters a mysterious phrase, the light illuminates and gives Torchy magical insights. Mr. Bumbledrop also builds a cardboard rocket ship, which allows the boy to soar through the heavens.

The brightest star in the night sky is Topsy Turvy Land, home of all of the abused and neglected toys that once belonged to naughty children.  There, the toys spring to life and animals have the ability to speak. Everyone is at home in this mysterious world, with its lollipop fields, cream bun trees, and chocolate puddles. However, Torchy frequently goes to earth to visit Mr. Bumbledrop, get replacement batteries, and return with naughty children who need to learn a lesson. In Topsy Turvy Land, humans shrink to the size of toys, and various children are subjected to the same horrors that they unleashed upon their playthings.

Production
Creator Roberta Leigh and producer Gerry Anderson had previously collaborated on the puppet show The Adventures of Twizzle, which was so successful that they were asked to do another show. The pair were able to negotiate more money nearly double what was spent on Twizzle, which afforded them the luxury of bringing more elaborate visuals to the screen.

Leigh churned out her scripts quickly, reportedly writing all 52 episodes over a total of 26 days. With her eight-year-old son in mind as the show's target demographic, Leigh set out to write an adventurous show, claiming that she was not pushing to include morality tales, but morals naturally came through her stories. As with Twizzle, Leigh devised recurring songs for many of the characters and would hum her tunes to composer Barry Gray, who was tasked with translating them into musical chords.

Puppet maker Christine Glanville began developing the look of Anderson's later "Supermarionation" shows, crafting the puppet bodies from wood, and sculpting heads with movable eyes and mouths, as well as adding thinner strings to make them less visible on film. Made in her garage, crafting the toys was a family affair, with Glanville's father creating the bodies, her mother sewing the clothes, and Christine sculpting the heads and putting finishing touches on the dolls.

The crew began tinkering with automatic lip-sync on two minor characters, and Glanville thought thin rubber might be the way to create the mouths, so she sent her father on a quest to buy condoms from various local vendors. This idea wound up being infeasible because the thin rubber was prone to breakage and paint would not stick to it, so they later switched to chamois leather.

Reg Hill and Derek Meddings created three-dimensional sets using cardboard cut-outs and wood, with a higher degree of detail than they could muster in Twizzle. Their Torchy sets included an elaborate miniature town shaped like fruit, with trees, shrubs, and rocks made of coal, as well as fully furnished miniature interior sets.

They could not afford a studio, so the production was set up in the ballroom of the Islet Park House, a mansion in Maidenhead on the banks of the River Thames. Unfortunately, a lack of space caused problems. The stage area was only about 20 square feet, with a cramped bridge that spanned the length of it for the puppeteers to perform on When the carpenters turned on their saws to create sets for the next day's shooting, the puppeteers were unable to sync to the audio playback.

Complicating matters, the river flooded that winter. Although the mansion's interior remained dry, the only way to get in and out of the location was by rowboat.  "When the river overflowed, we would stand on the ballroom's impressive veranda and watch the water rush past us below," recalled set dresser Bob Bell. "It was really quite frightening!"

The show was popular, garnering the attention of an up-and-coming band named The Beatles, who performed the title theme song live at The Cavern Club. At the start of 1969, Paul McCartney even riffed a portion of song during the recording sessions for the band's final album, Let It Be.

Characters
Numerous discrepancies in the spelling of names exist throughout the various Torchy materials.

Earthlings
Mr. Bumble-Drop: A kind elderly man who lets the neighbourhood children play in his garden. He is the creator of Torchy and the owner of Pom-Pom.
Bossy Boots: A bratty girl who acts as if she's the centre of the universe, demanding that everyone around her should do as she commands. She is plump and wears her hair in pigtails. Former owner of Flopsy the ragdoll and Clinker the money box.
Mrs. Meanymouth: Mother of Bogey, Mrs. Meanymouth is an undesirable woman who's not above stealing.
Bogey Meanymouth: An obnoxious boy who openly backtalks to his mother, Bogey is the former owner of Pongo the Pirate.
Bobby and Babs: A pair of twins who were once well-behaved, but have decided that it's much more fun to be naughty.

Topsy Turvians
Torchy: A battery-powered boy who has a magical flashlight on his hat. Torchy is good-natured, tries to help anyone in need, and he frequently finds ways to punish naughty children.
Clinker: A money-box formerly owned by Bossy Boots, who refused to save money, thus starving him. In Topsy Turvy Land, he finds a money tree that keeps him well fed.
Daffy: A donkey who pulls King Dithers' coach. She has a remarkable memory, although she's consistently glum, bearing more than a bit of similarity to Eeyore from the Winnie the Pooh series. She used to belong to a boy named Geoffrey. 
Ena: A hyena who'll laugh at anything, which endears her to Pillwig the clown. She loves to knit, but the garments that she makes are too big for anyone to wear.
 Flopsy: Bossy Boots' former rag doll, who was constantly abused by the girl. She hasn't got enough stuffing inside her because it has been pulled out, and the lack of substance in her head has made her a bit dim. Frequently forgetting words, she substitutes the phrase "Piggle-poggle."
King Dithers: The bumbling King of Topsy Turvy Land. It's repeatedly stated that he lives in an orange-peel palace, but his home resembles a run-of-the-mill castle.
Gillygolly: The tallest Gullywug in the world.
Man in the Moon: The sole inhabitant of the moon, who has grown weary of his nightly responsibilities illuminating the world. Although he's not a resident of Topsy Turvy Land, he appeared to be in a pair of series two episodes (since the puppet makers had moved on to another project).
Pilliwig: A clown who lives to entertain everyone whom he encounters.
Pollikan: A strange bird who vaguely resembles a pelican, Pollikan loves hiding shiny objects in his mouth, so King Dithers has entrusted the fowl with guarding his crown and jewels.
Pom-Pom: Mr. Bumbledrop's pet poodle. Pom-Pom's fur grows straight, so the vain pooch has to put curlers in it each night. Her favourite meal is meatballs in chocolate sauce, and since Mr. Bumbledrop would not allow her to eat chocolate, she decides to stay in Topsy Turvy Land, where she can lap up the chocolate puddles.
Pongo the Pirate: A toy formerly owned by Bogey Meanymouth, who continuously made him walk the plank and crash into the water. In Topsy Turvy Land, he fashions a boat from a grapefruit husk and is always looking for mischief.
Sparky: A young fire-breathing dragon who initially terrifies the Topsy Turvy residents. The only one of her kind in the vicinity, Sparky was incredibly lonely before Torchy discovered she was friendly. The dragon survives on a diet of spicy dishes such as peppers, which aid her fire-breathing abilities.
Squish: An American space boy toy who crash-landed and became stranded in Topsy Turvy Land. Although he's not as naughty as the other children of Earth, he sometimes does selfish, reckless things.
Ting-a-Ling: A chiming bird who does his best to help everyone whom he encounters. He is overtly feminine but referred to as male.
Whirly: A humming spinning top who was once rusty, until Torchy taught him that peanut oil is a lubricant.

Episodes
The show premiered in the Midlands in 1959, but it didn't premiere in London until 1960, where it aired consecutively for 52 weeks as one series. Writer Roberta Leigh obviously wrote several shows for the second series to bridge gaps in the first season's stories (denoted below). Presumably, these were aired on London television in the proper chronological story sequence, but on DVD, the shows were presented in production order as two separate series. TV listings of the era were primitive and online listings feature conflicting airdates, so the tables below list the two series without airdates, just as they appeared on DVD, in an effort to avoid inaccuracies.

Series One

Series Two

Merchandising
A small assortment of merchandise was issued during the show's run, most notably a series of books by creator Roberta Leigh, including an annual "Gift Book" from 1960–1964. Many of the featured stories were short adaptations of her scripts. Other merchandise included the board game Torchy's Race to Topsy Turvy Land, a children's playsuit which was packaged with a cardboard Torchy puppet, a pocketwatch, and a Torchy marionette by popular toymakers Pelham Puppets

Books

Torchy and the Magic Beam (1960)
Torchy in Topsy Turvy Land (1960)
Torchy Gift Book (1960)
Torchy Gift Book (1961)
Torchy and Bossy Boots (1962)
Torchy and His Two Best Friends (1962)
Torchy and the Twinkling Star (1962)
Torchy Gift Book (1962)
Torchy the Battery Boy Goes to a Party (196?)
Torchy Gift Book (1963)
Torchy Gift Book (1964)

Comics
Torchy appeared weekly from August 1960 to August 1961 across 52 issues of Harold Hare's Own Paper. The majority of characters were featured in the single-page comic strip, but Flopsy was referred to simply as Rag Doll (and she had normal eyes, as opposed to buttons), there was no Mr. Bumble-Drop, and Whirly and Ena never appeared. Torchy did occasionally venture back to earth to contend with Bogey and Bossyboots (whose name, like PomPom'''s was condensed to one word).

In 1968, Leigh was the editor of "Wonder," a weekly comic book that was sold at Esso petrol stations. Each issue featured a tie-in coverstory for her subsequent show Wonder Boy and Tiger, as well as a strip titled Bossy Boots. The character bore no physical resemblance to the puppet (she sported glasses and wore her hair in a ponytail), but like her Torchy'' counterpart, Bossy Boots loved to tell everyone what to do.

Harold Hare's Own Paper
Roberta Leigh loosely adapted her own stories from numerous episodes for the untitled strips, but many of the details were altered.

References

External links

Torchy the Battery Boy at Fanderson, the official Gerry Anderson appreciation society
Torchy the Battery Boy at Television Heaven

1950s British children's television series
1960s British children's television series
1959 British television series debuts
1961 British television series endings
AP Films
Black-and-white British television shows
ITV children's television shows
English-language television shows
British children's fantasy television series
Fictional dolls and dummies
Marionette films
British television shows featuring puppetry
Television shows produced by ABC Weekend TV
Sentient toys in fiction